Deuterosminthurus is a genus of springtails belonging to the family Bourletiellidae.

The species of this genus are found in Europe and Northern America.

Species

Species:

Deuterosminthurus bicinctus 
Deuterosminthurus bisetosus 
Deuterosminthurus caeruleacaudus

References

Collembola
Springtail genera